William H. Eckensberger, Jr. (born April 29, 1928) is a former Democratic member of the Pennsylvania House of Representatives.

References

Professional baseball player (1946) with the Carthage Cardinals (Missouri), part of the Cardinals baseball system.  Graduate of Muhlenberg College (1951). United States Army (1950-1952). Law degree from The George Washington University (1955). Justice of the Peace, Lehigh County Pennsylvania (1958-1965).

https://www.legis.state.pa.us/cfdocs/legis/BiosHistory/MemBio.cfm?ID=687&body=H

https://www.baseball-reference.com/register/player.fcgi?id=eckens001wil

Democratic Party members of the Pennsylvania House of Representatives
Possibly living people
1928 births